Hohenlohe is a German princely family and a district in Baden-Württemberg, Germany.

Historical states named Hohenlohe include:
Hohenlohe-Bartenstein
Hohenlohe-Ingelfingen
Hohenlohe-Jagstberg
Hohenlohe-Langenburg
Hohenlohe-Neuenstein
Hohenlohe-Öhringen
Hohenlohe-Schillingsfürst
Hohenlohe-Uffenheim-Speckfeld
Hohenlohe-Waldenburg
Hohenlohe-Weikersheim

People with the surname
Heinrich von Hohenlohe, 13th century Grand Master of the Teutonic Knights
Gottfried von Hohenlohe, 14th century Grand Master of the Teutonic Knights
Frederick Louis, Prince of Hohenlohe-Ingelfingen (1746-1818), Prussian general
Louis Aloy de Hohenlohe-Waldenburg-Bartenstein (1765–1829), marshal and peer of France
Prince Alexander of Hohenlohe-Waldenburg-Schillingsfürst (1794-1849), priest
Adolf zu Hohenlohe-Ingelfingen (1797–1873), soldier, prime minister
Gustav Adolf Hohenlohe (1823-1896), cardinal
Kraft, Prinz zu Hohenlohe-Ingelfingen (1827–1892), Prussian general and writer
Prince Chlodwig zu Hohenlohe-Schillingsfürst (1819–1901), Chancellor of Germany
Stephanie von Hohenlohe (1891-1972), socialite and spy
Prince Alfonso of Hohenlohe-Langenburg (1924–2003), Spanish businessman
Christoph von Hohenlohe (1956-2006), socialite
Hubertus von Hohenlohe (born 1959), Alpine skier

Other uses
Hohenloh, a suburb of Detmold
Hohenlohe, a historic village in Kitzen
Hohenlohe Island (Остров гогенлоэ), an island in Franz Josef Land, Russia, was named after this dynasty by the Austro-Hungarian North Pole Expedition.
Hohenlohe Regiment, a regiment of Swiss and German soldiers serving in the French Army between 1815 and 1831.

German-language surnames